Kfir Golan (born 10 June 1974) is a retired Israeli sprinter.

He competed at the 1994 European Championships and the 1995 World Championships without reaching the final. He won five national championships. In the 4 x 100 metres relay he competed at the 2000 Olympic Games and the 2001 World Championships without reaching the final.

His personal best time was 10.46 seconds, achieved in 1997.

References

External links
 

1974 births
Living people
Israeli male sprinters
Athletes (track and field) at the 2000 Summer Olympics
Olympic athletes of Israel